Tanguiyeh (also Romanized as Tangū’īyeh and Tangoo’yeh; also known as Tangū and Tangūyeh) is a village in Chahar Gonbad Rural District, in the Central District of Sirjan County, Kerman Province, Iran. At the 2006 census, its population was 19, in 6 families.

References 

Populated places in Sirjan County